The 2016 Giro d'Italia is the first of cycling's Grand Tours to take place in the 2016 road cycling season. It is the 99th edition of the Giro d'Italia and takes place over 21 stages, beginning in the Netherlands on 6 May and finishing in Turin on 29 May. After the first three stages take place in the Netherlands, most of the rest of the race will take place in Italy; France hosts one stage start and one stage finish, while Switzerland also hosts a stage start.

The eighteen UCI WorldTeams were automatically invited and obliged to enter the race. In January 2016, four UCI Professional Continental teams were awarded wildcard places in the race by RCS Sport, the organisers of the Giro, to complete the 22-team peloton. With nine riders on each team, the peloton consists of 198 riders. These riders came from 34 countries; more than a quarter of the peloton (53 riders) were Italian, while no other nation had more than 20 riders participating in the race.

Teams 

All 18 UCI WorldTeams were automatically invited and were obliged to attend the race. As the winner of the 2015 Coppa Italia competition,  were automatically given a wildcard invitation. There were two surprises in the remaining three wildcard invitations:  were not invited, nor were the Dutch , even though the race began in the Netherlands. Two of the remaining wildcards were given to Italian teams –  and  – and the last place was given to the Russian team .

UCI WorldTeams

  (riders)
  (riders)
  (riders)
  (riders)
  (riders)
  (riders)
  (riders)
  (riders)
  (riders)
  (riders)
  (riders)
  (riders)
  (riders)
  (riders)
  (riders)
  (riders)
  (riders)
  (riders)

UCI Professional Continental teams

  (riders)
  (riders)
  (riders)
  (riders)

Cyclists

By starting number

By team

By nationality 
The 198 riders that are competing in the 2016 Giro d'Italia originated from 34 different countries.

References

External links 
 

2016 Giro d'Italia
2016